Alexander Benjamin Katz (born October 12, 1994) is an American-Israeli professional baseball left-handed pitcher who is a free agent. He has played internationally for Team Israel.

Katz pitched for the St. John's Red Storm, and was part of the team that won the 2015 Big East Conference Regular Season and Tournament. He was drafted by the Chicago White Sox in the 27th Round of the 2015 Major League Baseball draft.

In 2015 and 2016 combined, pitching in the Rookie Pioneer League and Arizona League, the Class A South Atlantic League, and the Class A+ Carolina League, he was 0-3 with a 2.87 ERA and 6 saves. In 87.2 innings, he struck out 97 batters.

Katz pitched for Team Israel at the 2017 World Baseball Classic. He made four relief appearances and pitched a total of 3.1 scoreless innings. In May 2017, Katz was traded to the Baltimore Orioles for two international pool spots. In October 2018, he became a dual Israeli citizen. He pitched for the Israel national baseball team at the 2020 Summer Olympics in Tokyo in the summer of 2021. He will pitch for Team Israel in the 2023 World Baseball Classic in Miami, in March 2023.

Early life
Katz was born in Manhasset, New York, to Gary and Adrienne Katz. He has two older sisters, Anna and Natalie.

High school
Katz went to Herricks High School (Class of 2012) in New Hyde Park, New York, where he pitched and played first base and outfield. He threw a 84 mph fastball. He was an All-League selection as a junior, and named All-County, Second Team All-Long Island, 2012 honorable mention Rawlings/Perfect Game Preseason All-America, Perfect Game first team All-Northeast Region, MVP of the Nassau County Exceptional Senior Game, and won the Best Pitcher Award for the RTC Grand Slam Challenge (Long Island All-Star Game).

College
Katz then pitched for the St. John's Red Storm, attending the school on a baseball and academic scholarship, while majoring in sports management and minoring in business. As a freshman, Katz made 22 appearances, including two starts, and went 1-3 with one save and a 5.33 ERA. During the summer of 2013, Katz pitched in the Hamptons Collegiate Baseball League for the Shelter Island Bucks and in the Cape Cod Baseball League (CCBL) for the Yarmouth-Dennis Red Sox. Baseball America named Katz the top pitching prospect in the Hamptons Collegiate Baseball League for that season, and Perfect Game named him the Hamptons pitcher with the best breaking ball.

As a sophomore, Katz appeared in 16 games, including nine starts, and went 1-2 with a 3.86 ERA and 39 strikeouts in 42.0 innings of work. On April 2, 2014, Katz started and struck out five in 6.0 scoreless innings of no-hit ball to earn the win as part of a combined one-hit shutout at Wagner. In the summer of 2014, Katz returned to the CCBL, playing for the Chatham Anglers.

As a junior, Katz appeared in 19 games, including 6 starts, and went 3-1 with a 3.40 ERA and 52 strikeouts in 55.2 innings of work. He threw mostly a fastball, a changeup, and a slider. In March 2015, Katz was named the Big East Conference Pitcher of the Week after striking out 13 batters in 7.0 scoreless innings in a pair of appearances that helped St. John's post consecutive shutouts in a two-game week. Katz, who made one start and one relief appearance, had a career-high 13 strikeouts in 6.0 scoreless frames to earn the win in a start against Fairfield. Katz then added 1.0 shutout inning against Central Connecticut. The lefty surrendered just one hit in his two appearances to limit the opposition to a .048 batting average (1-for-21).  Katz was part of the St. John's Red Storm baseball team that won the 2015 Big East Conference Regular Season and Tournament.

Minor leagues

Chicago White Sox
Katz was drafted by the Chicago White Sox in the 27th round of the 2015 Major League Baseball draft.

In 2015, at the age of 20, he pitched for the Great Falls Voyagers of the Rookie Pioneer League, and for the Arizona League White Sox of the Rookie Arizona League. He was a combined 0-2 with a 2.20 ERA and 4 saves, as in 32.2 innings he struck out 40 batters.

In 2016, he pitched for the Kannapolis Intimidators of the Class A South Atlantic League, and the Winston-Salem Dash of the Class A+ Carolina League.  He was a combined 0-1 with a 3.27 ERA and 2 saves, and in 55 innings he struck out 57.

Baltimore Orioles
On May 20, 2017, the White Sox traded Katz to the Baltimore Orioles for two international pool signing bonus spots valued at over $750,000.  Orioles Executive Vice President Dan Duquette said of Katz: "He has a good fastball and excellent strikeout record. A lot of guys like him and they project him to be a major league reliever. We’re going to send him to Frederick.... He showed a good fastball and a really good breaking ball in the [World Baseball Classic]. We got a couple good looks at him."Brittany Ghiroli (May 20, 2017). "Orioles get pitcher Alex Katz from White Sox," mlb.com. At the time of the trade, Katz had struck out 10.1 batters per 9 innings in his 62-game, 102-inning minor league career. In 2017, pitching for the Kannapolis Intimidators before he was traded, he was 0-1 with a 4.40 ERA, and pitching for the Frederick Keys of the Class A+ Carolina League after the trade he was 3-2 with a 5.57 ERA.

Katz pitched in the 2018 season for the Delmarva Shorebirds of the Class A South Atlantic League, for whom he was 3-2 with a 4.26 ERA in 25 games, and for Frederick for whom he was 0-0 with a 4.50 ERA in 5 games.

Katz was released by the Orioles’ Single-A affiliate, the Frederick Keys, on October 18, 2018.

Chicago White Sox (second stint)
In late 2018, Katz signed a minor league deal to return to the Chicago White Sox organization, but was released during spring training in March 2019.

Long Island Ducks
On April 15, 2019, he was signed as a spring training invitee for the Long Island Ducks of the Atlantic League of Professional Baseball. In 2019 he was 0-0 with a 4.70 ERA over 15.1 innings for the Ducks. He became a free agent following the season.

Kansas City Royals
On February 12, 2020, Katz signed a minor league deal with the Kansas City Royals. Katz did not play in a game in 2020 due to the cancellation of the minor league season because of the COVID-19 pandemic. Katz was released by the Royals organization on November 12, 2020.

Chicago Cubs
On May 4, 2021, Katz signed a minor league deal with the Chicago Cubs. He was assigned to the Single-A Myrtle Beach Pelicans of the Low-A East, later receiving promotions to the Class A+ South Bend Cubs of the High-A Central and the Double-A Tennessee Smokies of the Double-A South. In 20 appearances between the three affiliates, Katz posted a cumulative 6.51 ERA with 44 strikeouts in 47.0 innings pitched. He elected minor league free agency following the 2021 season on November 7.

Staten Island FerryHawks
On April 18, 2022, Katz signed with the Long Island Ducks of the Atlantic League of Professional Baseball. However, he was released prior to the start of the season on April 22.

On May 3, 2022, Katz signed with the Staten Island FerryHawks of the Atlantic League. He was 1-1 with a 4.50 ERA in 23 relief appearances covering 24 innings in which he gave up 15 hits and struck out 31 batters (11.6 strikeouts per 9 innings).

Team Israel; World Baseball Classic and Olympics
Katz was on the roster for Israel at the 2017 World Baseball Classic qualifier, but did not make an appearance during the tournament. Team Israel beat Pakistan, Great Britain, and Brazil, all of which were better ranked.

Katz pitched for Team Israel at the 2017 World Baseball Classic, in March 2017. He pitched in 4 games, pitching 3.1 scoreless innings.

In October 2018 he became a dual Israeli citizen, partly to help Israel’s baseball team make the 2020 Olympics.

He pitched for the Israel national baseball team in two relief appearances at the 2020 Summer Olympics in Tokyo in the summer of 2021.

He will play for Team Israel in the 2023 World Baseball Classic in Miami, starting March 11–15, 2023. He will be playing for Team Israel manager and former All-Star Ian Kinsler, and alongside All-Star outfielder Joc Pederson and pitcher Dean Kremer, among others.

Business venture 
Katz, who describes himself as "a big sneakerhead," started a company named Stadium Custom Kicks, which customizes baseball cleats. Among the company's clients are Aaron Judge, Robinson Cano, José Altuve, Byron Buxton, Robbie Ray and a few hundred major leaguers and minor leaguers; 450 of them in the major leagues. While two thirds of his custom projects are baseball cleats, football and golf are close behind.

References

External links

 
 

1994 births
Living people
Arizona League White Sox players
Chatham Anglers players
Frederick Keys players
Great Falls Voyagers players
Jewish American baseball players
Kannapolis Intimidators players
Long Island Ducks players
St. John's Red Storm baseball players
Winston-Salem Dash players
Yarmouth–Dennis Red Sox players
2017 World Baseball Classic players
Israeli American
Israeli baseball players
South Bend Cubs players
Baseball players at the 2020 Summer Olympics
Olympic baseball players of Israel
21st-century American Jews
Myrtle Beach Pelicans players
Tennessee Smokies players
Herricks High School alumni
2023 World Baseball Classic players